Justice McGrath may refer:

John W. McGrath, associate justice and chief justice of the Michigan Supreme Court
Mike McGrath, chief justice of the Montana Supreme Court